Nicholas Rizzo (born 11 March 2000) is an Italian professional footballer who plays as a defender for  club Pro Vercelli, on loan from Genoa.

Club career
On 20 January 2023, Rizzo joined Pro Vercelli on loan.

Career statistics

Club

Notes

References

2000 births
Living people
Italian footballers
Italy youth international footballers
Association football defenders
Inter Milan players
Genoa C.F.C. players
Carrarese Calcio players
R.E. Virton players
F.C. Pro Vercelli 1892 players
Serie C players
Challenger Pro League players
Italian expatriate footballers
Italian expatriate sportspeople in Belgium
Expatriate footballers in Belgium